Naznaz (also Romanized as Nāznāz) is a village in Dul Rural District, in the Central District of Urmia County, West Azerbaijan Province, Iran. At the 2006 census, its population was 335, in 67 families.

References 

Populated places in Urmia County